A Greater Good (History 1998–2008) is a compilation and final release from Neuroticfish, available on the Phantom Sound & Vision label, and in the US released via Dancing Ferret Discs.

Track listing 
All tracks by Sascha Mario Klein except where noted

"Can't Stop a Riot" (Klein, Henning Verlage) – 5:13
"A Greater Good" (Klein, Verlage) – 6:03
"M.F.A.P.L." – 4:43
"Prostitute" – 4:15
"Skin" – 4:06
"The Bomb" – 5:55
"Velocity" – 5:00
"Need" – 5:42
"Close" – 5:49
"I Don't Need the City" – 4:39
"It's Not Me" – 5:17
"Care" – 6:10
"Suffocating Right " – 5:24
"Wake Me Up" – 5:11
"Black Again" – 5:08
"Waste" – 3:58

2008 compilation albums
Neuroticfish albums